Perfumed gloves, also referred to as sweet gloves, are perfumed gloves, often embroidered, introduced to England from Spain and Venice. They were popular as gifts in the 16th and 17th-centuries. Stories describe them as a conveyance of poison for Jeanne d'Albret and Gabrielle d'Estrees.

Practice of perfuming
Perfuming gloves was practised in Spain, and forty valuable pairs were offered as a prize at a 16th-century jousting match. The leather was immersed several times in wine mixed with waters of lily, of roses, orange flowers, cloves, citron, storax, civet, and ambergris. In England, the permanently scented leather was called "washed", perfumed gloves were sometimes called "sweet gloves". Perfuming enhanced the value of the gloves and also masked any residual odours remaining in the leather from the tanning process. In 1562, the English ambassador in Paris, Nicholas Throckmorton, wrote to the ambassador in Spain, Thomas Chaloner, asking him to send gloves perfumed with orange flowers and jasmine for himself and his wife.

Gloves for Princess Mary were perfumed by Cuthbert Blackeden, an apothecary who worked for Henry VIII. Prince Henry had perfumed gloves made of stag's leather and leather from Córdoba.

Perfumed gloves as gifts
Catherine de Medici (1519-1589) gave gloves to her daughter Elisabeth of Valois (1545-1568), wife of Philip II of Spain. Isabella D'Este (1474-1539) made her own scents and gave gloves to Claude of France (1499-1524). Perfumed gloves were often given as presents by aristocrats and courtiers in Tudor and Stuart England.

Elizabeth Neville, a daughter of John Neville of Chevet, had a pair of perfumed gloves costing £3-4s in her wedding apparel in 1526. Archangelo Arcano, one of Henry VIII's gunners and military engineers gave the king perfumed gloves, and Princess Mary was given perfumed gloves.

Elizabeth I and perfumed gloves
There were fears that gloves could be poisoned, and William Cecil wrote a memorandum for the safety of Elizabeth I, advising caution with gifts of perfumed clothing; "Item, that no manner of perfume, either in apparel or sleeves, gloves, or such like, or otherwise shall be appointed for your majesty's savour, be presented by  any stranger". Some of Elizabeth's gloves were made by John Wynyard, a page of the royal wardrobe. His equipment in 1564 included a perfuming pan made of steel. 

According to Edmund Howes,  when Edward de Vere, 17th Earl of Oxford returned from Italy in 1576, he brought "gloves, sweet bagges, a perfumed leather jerkin, and other pleasant things". Elizabeth was pleased with the scent of the gloves and thereafter it was known as the "Earle of Oxford's perfume". Although the story is of the period, and later widely popularised by Isaac Disraeli and others, perfume by that name does not seem to have been much used by Elizabethans.

Elizabeth sniffed gloves presented to her at Audley End in July 1578, and put them "half way upon her hands". Around this time, an Italian perfumer of gloves, Guillam Bisco, settled in London's Queenhithe Ward. Lady Walsingham gave Elizabeth I scented gloves with cuffs embroidered with seed pearl in January 1589. Court musicians of the Lupo and Bassano families gave Elizabeth I perfumed gloves as New Year's Day gifts in 1599/1600. Lady Anne Clifford gave Spanish leather gloves to Mary Sackville, the wife of Sir Henry Neville in December 1617.

Jacobean diplomacy
Perfumed gloves were frequently given as gifts by diplomats. In September 1603 the Spanish ambassador to England, the Count of Villamediana, brought a "great store of Spanish gloves, Hawks' hoods, leather for jerkins, and moreover a perfumer". In November Villamediana invited the Duke of Lennox and the Earl of Mar to dinner. According to Arbella Stuart, he asked them "to bring the Scottish ladies for he was desirous to see some natural beauties". The women from the Queen's household who accepted this invitation included Jean Drummond, the young Anna Hay, and Lady Carey. The ambassador gave Lady Carey a present of Spanish leather gloves at the dinner, and afterwards sent a gold necklace. These were diplomatic gifts intended to leverage support for Spanish policy at court.

The Earl of Nottingham was involved in the negotiations with Spain known as the Somerset House Conference and the subsequent ratification of the treaty at Valladolid. The King of Spain, Philip III gave him jewels and gilt plate. Gifts for his wife, Margaret Howard, Countess of Nottingham, included perfumed gloves and other perfumed goods.

References

External links
 Catherine de' Medici's Scented Gloves, Francesca Scantlebury, Costume Society
 Jessamy or Jasmine scented gloves, Costume Historian

Gloves
Gloves
Gloves
Perfumery